Jean-Charles Ninduab (1955–2005), known by his pen name Charlie Schlingo, was a French cartoonist and illustrator.

Schlingo was a contributor to Comix 2000, published by L'Association.

He died at age 49 as the result of a fall.

Schlingo's biography, Je voudrais me suicider mais j'ai pas le temps, by Jean Teulé and Florence Cestac, was published by Dargaud in  2009. Since 2009, the Angoulême International Comics Festival has awarded the Schlingo Prize.

1955 births
2005 deaths
Accidental deaths from falls
French cartoonists
Pseudonymous writers